Curtis Hudson "Trey" Allen III (born November 20, 1974) is an American lawyer who will serve as an associate justice of the North Carolina Supreme Court. He was elected in November 2022.

Early life and education 
Allen was born in Lumberton, North Carolina. He earned a Bachelor of Arts degree in political science from the University of North Carolina at Pembroke in 1997 and a Juris Doctor from the University of North Carolina School of Law in 2000.

Career 
From 2000 to 2005, Allen served in the United States Marine Corps. During his service, Allen was deployed to Iraq and was a member of the United States Marine Corps Judge Advocate Division. Allen later served as a law clerk for Paul Martin Newby and worked as an attorney at Tharrington Smith LLP in Raleigh, North Carolina. He was the Albert and Gladys Hall Coates Distinguished Term  associate Professor of Public Law and Government at the University of North Carolina at Chapel Hill and served as general counsel to the North Carolina Administrative Office of the Courts. Allen was elected to the North Carolina Supreme Court in November 2022, unseating incumbent Democrat Sam J. Ervin IV.

References

External links 

Living people
North Carolina lawyers
North Carolina Republicans
University of North Carolina at Pembroke alumni
University of North Carolina School of Law alumni
University of North Carolina at Chapel Hill faculty
People from Lumberton, North Carolina
People from Robeson County, North Carolina
Justices of the North Carolina Supreme Court
1974 births
21st-century American lawyers
21st-century American judges